Chen Wei-ping, also known as W.P. Chen or Wei-ping Chen (born 1879 or 1880 in Beijing, died 1972), was a Chinese diplomat.

Early life 
He studied at Peking Methodist University, Ohio Wesleyan University, University of Michigan and University of Boston. He returned to China in 1916 and became involved with the Chinese Christian press and organisations.

Career 
He served as Consul General of the Republic of China in Australia from 1931 to 1935, when China did not have an ambassador to Australia. He was succeeded by Pao Chun-jien.

As consul, he sought to increase Chinese exports to Australia and to warn Australians about Japan's increasing militarism and aggression, including publishing books and pamphlets. He sought concessions surrounding the White Australia policy. He sought to allow Chinese immigrants to return to China and be replaced by a relative to continue operating their business.

A history of the Kuomintang in Australasia concluded that Chen "received a great deal of criticism from the community, as he was seen as being more concerned with [KMT] party affairs than with improving the status of the Chinese in Australia."

He gave the inaugural George Ernest Morrison Lecture in Ethnology at Australian National University (expressing the "earnest hope that the Australian people will extend to my countrymen sympathy and trust and that the great nation of China may be united with the great Anglo-Saxon race to preserve the peace of the world.").

In later life, Chen became known as pastor of Shih‐Ling Church near Taipei, where President and Mrs Chiang Kai‐shek attended services, as they had in Nanking, where he was their personal minister.

References

Chinese diplomats
1880 births
1972 deaths